Henstedt-Ulzburg is a municipality in the district of Segeberg, in Schleswig-Holstein, Germany.

Geography
The municipality of Henstedt-Ulzburg is situated approximately 30 km north of Hamburg and 13 km north of Norderstedt. Currently it is the largest municipality in Schleswig-Holstein without town privileges. The rivers Alster and Pinnau rise in Henstedt-Ulzburg.

History
The growing greater community of Henstedt-Ulzburg came into being on January 1, 1970, with the unification of the municipalities of Götzberg, Henstedt (with Henstedt-Rhen) and Ulzburg (with Ulzburg Süd).
The three municipalities of Götzberg, Henstedt, and Ulzburg came into being during the Middle Ages as farming towns. Ulzburg is first mentioned in records in 1339, Henstedt in 1343, and Götzberg in 1520. Despite this, archaeological finds show that humans have lived in the area since the Paleolithic period, and the first settlements appeared there during the Bronze Age and the Iron Age.

Facilities
North of Rhen, there is a large 380 kV/110 kV-substation. To this substation belongs also a 99 metres tall lattice tower used for radio relay links. Under the legs of this tower a road passable for trucks, but closed for public traffic runs through.

Twin towns – sister cities

Henstedt-Ulzburg is twinned with:
 Maurepas, France
 Usedom, Germany
 Waterlooville, England, United Kingdom
 Wierzchowo, Poland

Notable people
 David Kross (born 1990), actor
 Ole Wittmann (born 1977), art historian

References

Segeberg